Hard to Love, How to Love is the second studio album (third overall) by South Korean boy band Beast. It was released on July 19, 2013 with the song "Shadow (Geurimja)" as promotional single. The entire album was produced by the member Yong Jun-hyung, along with Kim Tae-joo. Two songs from the album, "Will You Be Alright?" and "I'm Sorry", were released as digital singles as a preview for it.

Background
On May 27, 2013, the CEO of Cube Entertainment, Hong Seung-seong, revealed some details about Beast's upcoming album release: ″It's now time for me to show you the three big pictures we′ve drawn regarding Beast's comeback. Thanks to the Beast members and their efforts to put together a puzzle that will make everyone supporting them happy, Beast has confirmed a comeback date in July.″  The CEO also said, ″Beast's upcoming album, to be released in July, will be performed for the first time onstage at B2ST's exclusive concert to be held in the same month. Their music, which shines more brilliantly onstage, will kick off with a concert so that B2UTYs will be the ones to see it first. Many passionate debates, designs and fun ideas have been thrown out regarding the comeback and are still going on, so make sure you don't let go of your anticipation.″

On July 11, via Cube Entertainment's Twitter account, the label revealed the album's name, titled Hard to Love, How to Love, and the release date, July 19. A day later, on July 12, the label announced the promotional track of the album, titled "Shadow", and a promotional photo. On July 15, the label posted on their Twitter and Facebook accounts solo teaser photos from each member of the group, starting with Doo-joon and finishing with Dong-woon. It was also revealed the album's track list, composed by eight tracks.

Release
On May 29, 2013, a digital single, "Will You Be Okay?" was released, and a special video of the song was uploaded to Beast's official YouTube account.  The song went to number 1 on the Gaon Digital Chart and the Billboard K-pop Hot 100. A second song, "I'm Sorry", was released digitally on June 15 and also placed on both charts. Both songs were included on the upcoming album.

Hard to Love, How to Love was released in Korea on July 19, 2013.  It reached number 1 on South Korea's Gaon physical sales chart, Beast's first song to do so, and number 6 on the Billboard World Albums chart.  A Japanese edition of the album was released in Japan on October 30, 2013, and peaked at number 18 on the Oricon Albums Chart.  It contained the same material as the Korean edition but also included a Japanese-language version of "Shadow".

The Korean music video for "Shadow" was released on the group's official YouTube account on July 19, 2013.  The song reached number 2 on the Gaon Digital Chart and number 3 on the Billboard K-pop Hot 100.

Critical reception
Jeff Benjamin of Billboard described Hard to Love, How to Love ultimately as balanced.  He praised the impressive vocals on "Will You Be Okay?" and the range of notes sounded on "I'm Sorry".  He calls "Shadow" the album's centerpiece, with its "aggressive, piano-laden electro-pop beat" and elements reminiscent of their earlier song, "Fiction" from 2011's Fiction and Fact.

Composition
The album is composed by eight tracks, four new songs, an intro, an outro and two already-released singles. All songs from the album were written and produced by Kim Tae-joo and Beast member Yong Jun-hyung.  The album's cover art was created by Kim Do-ho.

Track listing

Personnel
 Hong Seung-seong - executive producer
 Shin Jeong-hwa - executive producer
 Park Choong-min - executive supervisor
 No Hyeon-tae - executive director
 Yong Jun-hyung - music producer
 Kim Tae-joo - music producer
 Im Sang-hyeok - production director
 Seo Jae-woo - music supervisor
 Jeong Ra-young - A&R
 Shin Jae-bin - recording engineer, mixing engineer (Cube Studio)
 Jeong Bu-yeon - recording engineer (Cube Studio)
 Jo-ssi ajeossi - mixing engineer (Cube Studio)
 Go Seung-wook - mixing engineer (Bono Studio)
 Choi Hyo-young - mastering engineer (Suono Mastering Studio)

Charts

Weekly charts

Year-end charts

Release history

References

External links 
 
 
 

Cube Entertainment albums
2013 albums
Dance-pop albums by South Korean artists
Highlight (band) albums
Korean-language albums